Neoleucinodes imperialis is a moth in the family Crambidae. It was described by Achille Guenée in 1854. It is found in Haiti, Honduras, Costa Rica, Panama and the Brazilian states of Paraná, Minas Gerais and Rio de Janeiro.

References

Moths described in 1854
Spilomelinae